The Tui Manu'a Graves Monument is a funerary marker and grave site on the island Ta'u, the largest island of the Manu'a group in American Samoa. It is located northwest of the junction of Ta'u Village and Ta'u Island Roads on the west side of the island. Three graves are marked by square sections of smoothed stones, while a fourth is marked by a marble column. A possible fifth grave, unmarked, is in the projection. It is the burial site of several (four or five) tu'i, or kings, of Manu'a, including Tui Manu'a Matelita and Tui Manu'a Elisala, the Samoan leader whose signature granted the United States hegemony over the islands.

The monument was listed on the National Register of Historic Places in 2015.

See also
Tui Manu'a
National Register of Historic Places listings in American Samoa

References

History of American Samoa
Monuments and memorials on the National Register of Historic Places
Buildings and structures on the National Register of Historic Places in American Samoa
Buildings and structures completed in 1909
1890s in American Samoa